Francesca Nunzi (born 27 December 1968) is an Italian actress. She  graduated at the Laboratory of Performing Exercises under Gigi Proietti and is best known for films such as Tinto Brass' sex comedies, Cheeky and Monella. She has also starred in several TV shows including Il bello delle donne.

Personal life 
In 2000, Nunzi married Otto Buffa with whom she has one child.

Selected filmography

Film
Oasi (1994)
Let's Not Keep in Touch (1994)
Simpatici & antipatici (1998)
Monella (1998)
Cheeky (2000)
E adesso sesso (2001)
Concrete Romance (2007)
Un'estate al mare (2008)
Many Kisses Later (2009)
Miami Beach (2016)

Television
Una donna per amico (1998)
Tutti gli uomini sono uguali (1998)
Il bello delle donne (2001)
Don Matteo (2002)

References

External links

1968 births
Actresses from Rome
Italian film actresses
Italian stage actresses
Italian television actresses
Living people
Place of birth missing (living people)